Daniel Ștefan Costescu (born 14 July 1976) is a Romanian former footballer who usually played as a striker. He scored 46 goals in 235 matches in the Romanian First Division, 47 goals in 141 matches in the Romanian Second Division and 8 goals in 19 matches in the Swiss Third Division. His first match in Divizia A (Romanian First Division) was Olimpia Satu Mare – Petrolul Ploiești 3–0 on 1 August 1998, while playing for Petrolul Ploiești. He was selected once in the Romanian Divisionary National Team (comprising players playing only in the Romanian leagues).

Career
Born in Câmpina, Prahova county, Costescu began playing football with Sterom Câmpina in Divizia D (Romanian Fourth Division), and in 1996 he moved to the representative team of the same town, Poiana Câmpina, in Divizia B, the Romanian Second Division. He played 2 years for Poiana Câmpina, scoring 15 goals in 60 games, helping the team getting a top 10 finish in both seasons.

He then attracted the interest of Petrolul Ploiești in Divizia A, the best team from the Prahova county, three-time champions of Romania. At Petrolul Ploiești he established himself as an important striker in the Romanian league, scoring 27 goals between 1999 and 2002. During his time at Petrolul Ploiești he caught the eyes of Romanian greats Steaua București and Dinamo Bucuresti.

After his experience at Petrolul Ploiești, he changed the team but not the city, signing for Astra Ploiești, where he had a prolific season, scoring 10 goals in 26 games, helping them to a record-high 9th position in Divizia A.

After his short spell at Astra Ploiești, he returned to Petrolul Ploiești, where he played for another 2 years, scoring 9 goals in 36 games.

In 2004, he transferred to a well-established club in Romania, FC Argeș Pitești, 2-time champions of Romania and the team that gave players like Nicolae Dobrin, Adrian Mutu, Adrian Neaga, Dănuț Coman and Paul Codrea. But, unfortunately for him, his time at FC Argeș was not one of the best, managing to score just 2 goals in 1 season.

He was transferred in 2006 by Divizia A newcomers Unirea Urziceni, who were in need of an experienced man upfront. Unirea proved to be a surprise-pack, finishing 10th in the league, and Daniel scored 2 goals for his new team.

After his season at Unirea he transferred to Ceahlăul Piatra Neamț.

References

1976 births
Living people
Romanian footballers
Association football forwards
Liga I players
Liga II players
FC Astra Giurgiu players
FC Argeș Pitești players
FCM Câmpina players
FC Unirea Urziceni players
CSM Ceahlăul Piatra Neamț players
CS Mioveni players
FC Progresul București players
FC Delta Dobrogea Tulcea players
FC Baulmes players
Swiss 1. Liga (football) players
Romanian expatriate footballers
Expatriate footballers in Switzerland
Romanian expatriate sportspeople in Switzerland